Long Island Fury is an American women’s soccer team, founded in 2005. The team is a member of the Women's Premier Soccer League, the second tier of women’s soccer in the United States and Canada. The team plays in the Mid-Atlantic Division of the East Conference.

The team plays its home games at the Mitchel Athletic Complex in Uniondale, New York. The club's colors are red and navy blue.

The team is a sister organization of the men's Long Island Academy team, which plays in the National Premier Soccer League.

Players

Notable former players
The following former Fury players have played at the senior international and/or professional level:

 Michelle Betos
 Maia Cabrera
 Marie Curtin
 Christina DiMartino
 Gina DiMartino
 Allie Long
 Rebecca Moros
 Alex Singer
 Sue Weber

Year-by-year

Honors
 WPSL East Mid-Atlantic Division Champions 2008
 WPSL Champions 2006

Coaches
  Paul Riley 2006–2008

Stadia
 Mitchel Athletic Complex, Uniondale, New York 2008–present
 Kings Point 2008 (3 games)
 Michael Tully Field New Hyde Park, New York 2008 (1 game)

See also
 New York Fury

References

External links
 Official Site
 WPSL Long Island Fury page

   

Women's Premier Soccer League teams
Association football clubs established in 2005
Women's soccer clubs in the United States
Women's soccer clubs in New York (state)
2005 establishments in New York (state)